Bathysoma lutkeni is an extinct lamprid from the Danian age of Sweden, and is the second oldest lamprid known, after Nardovelifer of Campanian/Maastrichtian Italy.  B. lutkeni has a disk-shaped body and an elongated head.  It was originally described as a menid bony fish.  Later, it was described as being a basal snake mackerel.  Eventually, anatomical similarities with the Turkmenids were noted, and B. lutkeni is now regarded as an extremely basal lamprid.

References

External links
 Bathysoma at the Paleobiology Database
Lampridiformes

Ray-finned fish enigmatic taxa
Lampriformes
Paleocene fish
Paleocene genus extinctions
Paleogene fish of Europe
Fossil taxa described in 1890